Neolissochilus tamiraparaniensis is a species of cyprinid fish. It is endemic to the Western Ghats of India and occurs in the Thamirabarani River system. It grows to  standard length.

References

Cyprinidae
Cyprinid fish of Asia
Freshwater fish of India
Endemic fauna of the Western Ghats
Fish described in 2017